Doller is a surname. Notable people with the surname include:

 Ben Doller (born 1973), American poet and writer
 Mikhail Doller (1889–1952), Lithuanian film director

See also
 Dollery